KK Berane Bobcats is a professional basketball club from Berane, Montenegro. The team currently competes in Prva B Liga.

History
The club was founded in 2010 as KK Lim. From 2011-2016 it was called KK Berane. In the 2016/2017 season the club was again renamed, this time to Berane Bobcats. The biggest success of the senior team is the title of Prva B Liga Championship in season 2016/2017.

Honours

Domestic competitions

League
Prva Erste Liga
Winners (0): none
Runners-up (0): none

Prva B Liga
Winners (1): 2017
Runners-up (0): none

Cups
Montenegrin Basketball Cup
Winners (0): none
Runners-up (0): none
Best placement: Quarter finals (2016/17)

Supporters
Berane supporters are known as "Uličari" (Streetboys). A group formed in 1994.

Roster

Depth chart

Notable former players
  Vladimir Boričić
  Milovan Čukić
  Vladimir Čuljković
  Miljan Kastratović
  Marko Neradović
  Vladimir Tomašević
  Ognjen Nišavić

See also

Handball Club Berane
Football Club Berane

References

http://www.kosarka.me/crna-gora/prva-a-prva-b-liga/tag/Berane%20Bobcats

http://superkosarka.com/2016/08/29/will-tolefree-novi-igrac-berane-bobcatsa/

http://basketball.realgm.com/player/William-Tolefree/Summary/63451

http://m.espn.com/ncb/playercard?playerId=3160078&src=desktop

http://www.kosarka.me/crna-gora/prva-a-prva-b-liga/8595-berane-bobketsi-sve-blize-eliti

https://web.archive.org/web/20170403112243/https://radioberane.wordpress.com/2017/04/01/prvoligaska-kosarka-vraca-se-u-berane/

https://web.archive.org/web/20170225133522/http://mnesport.me/kosarka/kosarka-muskarci/kosarka-kup-crne-gore

External links
 http://basketball.eurobasket.com/team/Montenegro/KK-Berane-Bobcats/15563
 http://berane.me

Basketball teams in Montenegro
Berane